Morris Township is one of the twenty-two townships of Knox County, Ohio, United States.  The 2010 census found 2,049 people in the township.

Geography
Located in the west central part of the county, it borders the following townships:
Berlin Township - north
Pike Township - northeast
Monroe Township - east
Clinton Township - south
Liberty Township - southwest corner
Wayne Township - west
Middlebury Township - northwest corner

Small parts of two municipalities are located in Morris Township: the city of Mount Vernon, the county seat of Knox County, in the southeast; and the village of Fredericktown, in the northwest.

Name and history
Morris Township was established in 1812. It was named after Morris County, New Jersey, the native home of many of the township's pioneer settlers.

It is the only Morris Township statewide.

Government
The township is governed by a three-member board of trustees, who are elected in November of odd-numbered years to a four-year term beginning on the following January 1. Two are elected in the year after the presidential election and one is elected in the year before it. There is also an elected township fiscal officer, who serves a four-year term beginning on April 1 of the year after the election, which is held in November of the year before the presidential election. Vacancies in the fiscal officership or on the board of trustees are filled by the remaining trustees.

References

External links
County website

Townships in Knox County, Ohio
Townships in Ohio